The 1994 Vuelta a Murcia was the tenth edition of the Vuelta a Murcia cycle race and was held on 8 March to 13 March 1994. The race started in La Manga and finished in Murcia. The race was won by Melcior Mauri.

General classification

References

1994
1994 in road cycling
1994 in Spanish sport
March 1994 sports events in Europe